Events from the year 1883 in China.

Incumbents
 Guangxu Emperor (9th year)
 Regent: Empress Dowager Cixi

Events
Tonkin Campaign
May 19 - Battle of Cầu Giấy (Paper Bridge)
December 11–17 - Sơn Tây Campaign

Births
March 8 - Huang Fu
October 8 - Yan Xishan
 Chen Xiefen (1883–1923), was a Chinese feminist and journalist, regarded as one of the first feminists and female journalists in China

Deaths
 September 23: Seah Eu Chin, Singapore

 
1880s in China
Years of the 19th century in China